Beauty and the Beast is the second EP released by hip hop artist Rapsody. It was released on October 7, 2014, by Jamla Records.

Background 
On September 9, 2014, Rapsody announced her latest project on Instagram with the release date of October 7, 2014, along with a picture of the artwork. After the EP's release, she released music videos for the songs Drama, Godzilla, and The Man through VEVO all directed by Cam Be.

Critical reception 

Beauty and the Beast received generally positive reviews from critics. HipHopDX reviewer Marcus Dowling called it "a stellar take on her strengths", albeit one that does not "experiment enough with her delivery to truly carry Jamla's searing production." Justin Charity from Complex regarded the EP as "a work of brute strength and self-determination. There’s zero capitulation to popular taste." In Vice, Robert Christgau called it an "underground rap manifesto as genuinely worthwhile endeavor", citing "Hard to Choose" and "The Man" as highlights.

Track listing  
 All songs written by Rapsody.

References

Albums produced by 9th Wonder
Albums produced by Khrysis
2014 EPs
Hip hop EPs
Rapsody albums